Tom Chavez is a hi-tech entrepreneur, author and co-founder of super{set}, a startup studio that builds and funds software companies.

Early life and education 
Chavez was born and raised in Albuquerque, New Mexico. He is one of five children from a working-class family of Spanish and Mexican descent, and his paternal side traces its roots back to one of the original settlers of Santa Fe, Don Pedro Duran y Chavez.
 
Chavez graduated from Albuquerque Academy in 1986. He earned a B.A. in 1990 in computer science and philosophy magna cum laude from Harvard University and a Ph.D. in engineering-economic systems and operations research from Stanford University, where he was a NASA doctoral fellow.

Career 
Before starting Rapt, he worked for Sun Microsystems and at a think tank called Rockwell. Chavez launched his first startup, Rapt, a company that creates software for Web publishers, in 1998. As CEO and co-founder, Chavez led the company for 10 years until its acquisition by Microsoft for $180 million in 2008. In 2010, Chavez launched his second venture, Krux, which scanned devices for information. The analytics company was bought by Salesforce in 2016. In 2018, Chavez launched San Francisco-based venture studio super{set} which forms software startups and supports them from its own venture capital fund. As of 2019, companies led by Chavez have generated a 17.5x return for investors.

Writing 
Chavez is the co-author of Data Driven: Harnessing Data and AI to Reinvent Customer Engagement, and winner of the 2019 Axiom Business Book Award Silver Medalist in Business Technology.

Philanthropy 
Chavez co-founded the Chavez Family Foundation. The Foundation invests in non-profit projects in education, immigration, and entrepreneurship. Organizations they support include Immigrants Rising, Mission Asset Fund, and Immigrant Legal Resource Center.

The Chavez Family Foundation was a founding investor in the California Campus Catalyst Fund, an initiative that works to expand support to undocumented students and their families across the state's three public higher education systems: California Community Colleges, California State University, and University of California.

Chavez sits on the non-profit boards of KQED (public media for the Bay Area) and VH1's Save the Music Foundation.

References 

Businesspeople from Albuquerque, New Mexico
Chief executive officers
Stanford University alumni
Harvard College alumni